is a Japanese manga artist from Yokohama. He is best known for the series The Kabocha Wine, which was adapted as an anime television series, and for which he received the 1983 Kodansha Manga Award for shōnen.

Career 
Miura’s career took off in 1971, while he was attending Isogo Technical High School. After graduating high school, he went on to be an assistant at Tezuka Productions. Soon after in 1973, he won an Honorable Mention in the 6th Tezuka Award for his series , and another Honorable Mention in 9th Tezuka Award in 1975 for his series .

In 1980, Miura wrote a one-off manga called  that released in Weekly Shōnen Magazine. This short story soon evolved into his most popular manga series, The Kabocha Wine, running from 1981 to 1984, containing 18 volumes, and a 95-episode anime series released by Toei Animation, airing from July 5th, 1982 until August 25th, 1984. He credits the inspiration for the series’ title from a commercial he once saw, saying , which then turned into “The Kabocha Wine”, saying that the title had nothing to do with the series’ overall premise. His main inspiration for the series was his own childhood, saying that he was usually shorter than most kids in his class, and finding himself attracted to the taller girls at school. To add, the main character, Shunsuke Aoba, is inspired by Miura himself. The female lead, Natsumi Asaoka (known as “L”), is cited to be partially inspired by Yoshiko Miyazaki, a Japanese Swimsuit model and Actress.

Miura returned to The Kabocha Wine in 2006 with “The Kabocha Wine - Sequel” and “The Kabocha Wine - Another”, with the latter being turned into a live action movie in 2007, which received mixed reviews. In 2017, he returned to the series for the last time with the title . After a successful crowdfunding event, he officially retired from manga after a 45-year-long career. Nowadays, he’s been working on picture books and being active on his Twitter, @miura_mitsuru.

in 2021, with a partnership with 7-Eleven and Lawson (store), a re-release of the manga for “The Kabocha Wine” began, releasing books all over Japanese convenience stores, with 4 volumes released as of May 24, 2022, and a 5th volume on its way.

Manga

References

External links 
 

Manga artists from Kanagawa Prefecture
Japanese illustrators
Winner of Kodansha Manga Award (Shōnen)
Living people
1954 births